Escuela Superior de Guerra may refer to:
 Escuela Superior de Guerra (Argentina)
 Escuela Superior de Guerra (Colombia)

See also 
 Escola Superior de Guerra, Brazil